Birgitta Fritz (born January 1935) was a longtime associate professor (docent) of history at the Stockholm University.  In 1972, she completed her Ph.D. thesis Hus, land och län. Förvaltningen i Sverige 1250-1434, ("House, country and county. Administration in Sweden 1250-1434") which became one of the most important works concerning Swedish history.

References 

1935 births
Living people
20th-century Swedish historians
Academic staff of Stockholm University
Swedish women historians